Tritoxa decipiens is a species of picture-winged fly in the genus Tritoxa of the family Ulidiidae.

Distribution
United States.

References

Ulidiidae
Diptera of North America
Insects described in 2021